Kulivatnet is a lake in the municipality of Sirdal in Agder county, Norway. It sits just  downhill from the border with Bjerkreim municipality in Rogaland county. The  lake is somewhat V-shaped and it has a small dam on the southeastern side to hold water for hydroelectric power generation.

See also
List of lakes in Norway

References

Lakes of Agder
Sirdal